Nepherites II or Nefaarud II was the last pharaoh of the feeble and short-lived Twenty-ninth Dynasty (399/8–380 BC), the penultimate native dynasty of Egypt.

Short reign 
An "ineffectual" ruler, Nepherites II became pharaoh of Egypt in 380 BC after the death of his father Hakor (393–380 BC) and was deposed and likely killed by the rebel prince Nakhtnebef of Sebennytos – the future Nectanebo I, an Egyptian military officer, after ruling Egypt for only 4 months, from June to September 380 BC.

King Hakor had already to face, towards the end of his reign, frequent riots likely inspired by Nectanebo. Pharaoh Nectanebo I, who founded the Thirtieth Dynasty of Egypt after overthrowing Nepherites II, reigned until his death in 360 BC and represented the third Delta family to assume the rule of the country in just two decades: a signal that Egypt's last phase of independence under native rulers, begun with Amyrtaeus' coup in 404 BC against Persia, was particularly unstable. A quick reference to Nepherites II's fall can be found in a large limestone stela Nectanebo I commissioned in Hermopolis:

The Greek historian Theopompus (c. 380–315 BC) links Nepherites II's end with the war led by King Evagoras I of Salamis on Cyprus against Persia. In a desperate attempt to strengthen his own position, Nepherites II proclaimed himself Wehem Mesut, "Repetitor Of Births" (i.e. Founder of a new era), "like few other sovereigns of the past of very different stature", such as Amenemhat I and Seti I.

His nomen or birth name, meaning "The Great Ones prosper", does not appear on any monument, and it is only attested in Manetho's Aegyptiaca and in the 3rd century BC Demotic Chronicle.

References

Bibliography 

 Cimmino, Franco (2003). Dizionario delle Dinastie Faraoniche. Milan: Bompiani. .
 Clayton, Peter A. (1999). Chronicles of the Pharaohs. London: Thames and Hudson. .
 Wilkinson, Toby (2011). The Rise and Fall of Ancient Egypt. London: Bloomsbury. .

4th-century BC Pharaohs
Pharaohs of the Twenty-ninth Dynasty of Egypt
Year of birth unknown
380 BC deaths
Ancient murdered monarchs